Basie Land is a 1964 studio album by Count Basie and his orchestra, of music composed and arranged by Billy Byers.

Track listing 
 "Basie Land" –  2:16
 "Big Brother" – 3:43
 "Count Me In" – 4:32
 "Wanderlust" – 2:38
 "Instant Blues" – 4:54
 "Rabble Rouser" – 3:08
 "Sassy" – 3:21
 "Gymnastics" – 2:29
 "Yuriko" – 4:13
 "Doodle-Oodle" – 3:16

All music composed by Billy Byers.

Personnel 
The Count Basie Orchestra

 Count Basie - piano
 Al Aarons - trumpet
 Sonny Cohn
 Don Rader
 Snooky Young
 Henry Coker - trombone
 Urbie Green
 Grover Mitchell
 Benny Powell
 Marshal Royal - clarinet, alto saxophone
 Frank Foster - flute, alto saxophone, tenor saxophone
 Frank Wess
 Charlie Fowlkes - baritone saxophone
 Freddie Green - guitar
 Buddy Catlett - double bass
 Sonny Payne - drums
 Billy Byers - arranger, conductor

References 

1964 albums
Count Basie Orchestra albums
Verve Records albums
Albums conducted by Billy Blyers
Albums arranged by Billy Blyers